Bunda is one of the seven districts of Mara Region in the United Republic of Tanzania, East Africa. It is bordered to the north by the Musoma Rural District and Butiama District, to the east by Serengeti District, to the south by Bariadi District and Busega District, and to the west by Lake Victoria. The district administration town is also called Bunda, located on the north-south trans-national all tarmac highway from Kenya to Zambia via Tarime and the lakeside municipalities of Musoma, Mwanza, and thereon to Mbeya in southern Tanzania. The district has four divisions: Kenkombyo, Nansimo, Serengeti and Chamuriho.

Bunda Town, a small town 70 km south of Musoma and west of the Serengeti National Park, serves as the district's capital. According to the 2012 Tanzania National Census, the population of Bunda District was 335,061.

Transport
Paved Trunk road T4 from Mwanza to the Kenyan border passes through Bunda District from south to north.

Administrative subdivisions
As of 2012, Bunda District was administratively divided into 28 wards.

Wards 

 Balili
 Bunda Mjini
 Bunda Stoo
 Butimba
 Chitengule
 Guta
 Hunyari
 Igundu
 Iramba
 Kabasa
 Kasuguti
 Ketare
 Kibara
 Kisorya
 Kunzugu
 Mcharo
 Mihingo
 Mugeta
 Namhula
 Nampindi
 Nansimo
 Neruma
 Nyamang'uta
 Nyamuswa
 Nyasura
 Salama
 Sazira
 Wariku

Notable persons from Bunda District
 Joseph Warioba, 5th Tanzanian Prime Minister

References

Districts of Mara Region